Jacqueline Pierreux (15 January 1923 – 10 March 2005) was a French film and television actress. From the early 1970s onwards she also enjoyed success as a producer.
She was the wife of screenwriter Pierre Léaud and the mother of prolific film actor Jean-Pierre Léaud who starred in Francois Truffaut's The 400 Blows and Day For Night.

Selected filmography
 The Midnight Sun (1943)
 Six Hours to Lose (1946)
 The Ideal Couple (1946)
 That's Not the Way to Die (1946)
 Between Eleven and Midnight (1949)
 L' Amore di Norma (1950)
 Rome Express (1950)
 Women and Brigands (1950)
 Le Dindon (1951)
 The Case of Doctor Galloy (1951)
 Abbiamo vinto! (1951)
 Malavita (1951)
 We Are All Murderers (1952)
 The Porter from Maxim's (1953)
 Top of the Form (1953)
 This Man Is Dangerous (1953)
 After You Duchess (1954)
 Légère et court vêtue (1954)
 Il seduttore (1954)
 The Cock Crow (1955)
 Mannequins of Paris (1956)
 The Big Lie (1956)
 Who Hesitates Is Lost (1960)
 La Vendetta (1962)
 The Reunion 
 Black Sabbath Segment: "Drop of Water" (1963)
 Home Sweet Home (1973)
 The Bear Cage (1974)

References

Bibliography
 Philip Mosley. Split Screen: Belgian Cinema and Cultural Identity. SUNY Press, 2001.

External links

1923 births
2005 deaths
French film actresses
French film producers
Actors from Rouen
20th-century French actresses
Film people from Rouen